This annotated bibliography is intended to list both notable and not so notable works of English language, non-fiction and fiction related to the sport of fly fishing listed by year published. Although 100% of any book listed is not necessarily devoted to fly fishing, all these titles have significant fly fishing content. Included in this bibliography is a list of species related fly fishing literature.
 For readability, the bibliography is contained in three separate lists. For classic general texts, history of fly fishing and fly fishing library collections see: Bibliography of fly fishing
 For fly tying, fly tackle, regional guides, memoirs, stories and fly fishing fiction see: Bibliography of fly fishing (fly tying, stories, fiction)

Annotations

Annotations may reflect descriptive comments from the book's dust jacket, third party reviews or personal, descriptive and qualitative comments by individuals who have read the book. Some older works have links to online versions in the Internet Archive or Google Books.

Fly fishing for trout

19th century

(1900–1930s)
 
 
 

 
 
  The Dry Fly and Fast Water is one of the classic works on American fly fishing. In it La Branche, a contemporary of Theodore Gordon, helped established a unique early 20th-century American approach to dry fly fishing distinctly evolved from the long-standing theories of the British angler Halford.
 
 
  Skues was the greatest early twentieth-century authority on nymph fishing for trout.

(1940–1970s)
 
  One of the most important angling books of the 20th century A Modern Dry Fly Code, Marinaro revolutionized American trout fishing with his experiences on the Pennsylvania spring creeks in the 1940s and 50s.

 
 
  Ray Bergman, one of the great angling writers of the 20th centuryThe Dr. Spock of American fly fishing in the mid-20th centurywas a former editor of Outdoor Life magazine.

 
 
  An easy reading, contemporary (post WW II) review of the various species of trout, how to fish for them and the various types of flies to use. Contains a dictionary of 'Productive Patterns' with pattern recipes and nice color plates.
 
 
  Fox, who Arnold Gingrich calls the Chaucer of the Le Tort, was one of the Pennsylvania spring creek anglers who pioneered terrestrial fishing with small flies on spring creeks. Gingrich believed This Wonderful World of Trout deserved a permanent place in every fly fishers library.
  Describes the flies and nymphs significant in trout fishing, and explains the procedures for constructing imitations
 
  Considered the most popular, all-around fly fishing book in the late 20th century by Paul Schullery in American Fly Fishing – A History
 

  the first comprehensive, in-depth study of the Brown Trout, Salmo Trutta: its origin, distribution, anatomy, life history, diet; the methods used to manage and propagate it; and the tactics and tackle that have been developed to fish for it.
  focused on Western Trout fishing, The Trout and The Stream help popularize large and heavy stonefly nymph fishing in the West
  A compilation of the observations, discoveries, and informed opinions of a man who knows trout. Discusses the literature, ecology and techniques of trout fishing. The author refers mainly to New England limestone rivers, and the LeTort in particular.
 

  This is Ovington's seventh book on trout and fly fishing. He concentrates on the development of both the skills and the instinctive know-how necessary to fully appreciate the fine art of taking trout on flies.

(1980s–1990s)
  Contains four Color Plates of dry flies
 
  Tips and techniques written in John Gierach's passionate and notable style.

21st century
 
 
  This book provides a well written, insiders look into the techniques, equipment and personalities employed in manufacture of R. L. Winston Bamboo Fly Rods by Jerry and the crew at the Twin Bridges, Montana, factory. His stories do a nice job of revealing the whole karma around fishing for trout with Bamboo. Jerry also provides some interesting cultural and environmental insights about the rivers in Twin Bridges and Western Montana in general.

Fly fishing for salmon, steelhead, and seatrout
  Entertaining anecdotes abound, and useful information relating to making flies and the fine art of salmon fishing is masterfully recounted.
 
 
 
 
 
 
 
 
 
 
 
 
 , A comprehensive look at all aspects of Atlantic Salmon fishing and dressing Atlantic Salmon flies. Eight color plates of Flies.
 
 
  Steelhead Fly Fishing and Flies recounts the early history of Steelhead fishing and the variety of flies used. Full of color plates and B&W photos of many of the early Steelhead fly tyers  such as Roderick Haig-Brown and Enos Bradner.

Fly fishing for bass
  The seminal work describing the Black Basses (Sunfish) of N. America as well as all the various techniques used to catch them.
 
 
  This is one of those dated, but well-written books on bass fishing that every serious recreational bass angler ought to read. This well illustrated (photos) book provides useful information on fishing for both large and smallmouth bass, especially in rivers and streams.
 
 
 
  Contains beautiful color plates of bass poppers and flies as well as interesting bass fishing photos.
 
  This book focuses on mainly fly fishing techniques for bass encountered in all types of waters.

Fly fishing for panfish
 
 
 
  In The Sunfishes Jack Ellis transcends the cavalier attitude with which many anglers approach sunfish. This is not a book about tossing a yellow popping bug or gaudy wet fly into a school of hungry, gullible bluegills in a suburban pond. The Sunfishes is written with the same thoughtfulness, zeal, and respect as are most trout-fishing books.
  Small Fry: The Lure of the Little is a literary study of small fish and small waters, a survey of fly fishing literature, and a personal memoir contrasting youthful fishing stories with contemporary angling adventures. The author's search for small fry on the fly takes him to places as remote as the small streams in the Appalachian Mountains and as urban as the ponds in Manhattan's Central Park. Laced with the humor and the poetry of experience, Small Fry reveals why “the lure of the little” is a passion worth catching.

Fly fishing for rough and other species
 
  Everything you ever want to know about Shad and shad fishing techniques. Contains several chapters on fly fishing for shad and the flies to use.
  This book takes a seasonal approach to address everything you need to know to catch northerns, tigers and muskies on a fly.

Stillwater fly fishing
  One of the two or three really important books on stillwater fly fishing in Britain. It gave a rationale to the earlier reservoir angler, and is still one of the most useful books on the subject. Full of sensible and practical ideas and advice.
  The Natural Fly, its Matching Artificial and Fishing Technique. A book which deals with the more common flies found in stillwater, on many English lakes, lochs and reservoirs, and provides extensive information on fishing methods, and the various techniques required to fish the many hundreds of artificial patterns listed.
  a comprehensive guide to fly fishing on lakes, particularly for trout. With color plates and an extensive bibliography. One of the most important American books on the subject of stillwater fly fishing

Saltwater fly fishing
  Sand's Saltwater Fly Fishing is the first really comprehensive treatment of the application of fly-fishing techniques to saltwater species in both cold and warm waters.
 

  this illustrated guide to saltwater fly fishing includes everything the angler need to know to be successful in the salt. Includes where to find the best places to fish in New England.

Notes

Fly fishing literature
Fly fishing
Recreational fishing-related lists